Ali Ghulam Nizamani is a Pakistani politician who has been a member of the Provincial Assembly of Sindh since August 2018.

Political career

He was elected to the Provincial Assembly of Sindh as a candidate of Grand Democratic Alliance from Constituency PS-41 (Sanghar-I) in 2018 Pakistani general election.

References

Living people
Grand Democratic Alliance MPAs (Sindh)
Year of birth missing (living people)